Jana Plodková (sometimes Jana Plodek; born 5 August 1981, Jičín) is a Czech actress. She studied at the Janáček Academy of Music and Performing Arts. She speaks German fluently.

Theatre

Janáček Academy of Musical Arts
Monster
Choroby mládí

HaDivadlo
Černá sanitka
Doma u Hitlerů
Ředitelská lóže
Pařeniště
Indián v ohrožení
The Makropulos Affair
Cult Fiction I
Yvonne, princess of Burgundian
Incident
Renata Kalenská 
Madhouse
Scherz, Satire, Ironie und tiefere Bedeutung
Vycucnutí
Sloní muž - Život a dobrodružství Josepha C. Merricka
Silvestr 2574
Ruská ruleta
Odhalení
Lulu
The Incident
Ignatiúv vzestup

Filmography
Příběh vánoční (2002)
Domenica pomeriggio (2005) - Katharina
Nejlepší je pěnivá (2005)
Prag (2006) - Alena
Empties (2007) - Čárkovaná
Protektor (2009) - Hana Vrbatová
Ocas ještěrky (2009)
Lost in Munich (2015) - Interpreter
 The Christmas Fish (2018) (Short) - Růžena
Hodinářův učeň (2019) - Lichoradka
Island (2023) - Alice

Episode roles in TV series
"Comeback" (16 October 2008) 
"Na stojáka" (2008)
"Hvězdný reportér" (2008)
"Kosmo" (2016)

References

External links
Czechoslovak Film Database (Czech)

Biography in HaTheatre (Czech)

Living people
1981 births
Czech film actresses
Czech television actresses
Czech stage actresses
Janáček Academy of Music and Performing Arts alumni
People from Jičín
21st-century Czech actresses
Czech Lion Awards winners